The Women's National Basketball Association's (WNBA) rebounding leader is the player with the highest rebounds per game average in a given season.

Rebounding leaders

See also
 WNBA Peak Performers

External links 
 WNBA Year-by-Year Leaders and Records for Rebounds Per Game by Basketball-Reference.com

Lists of Women's National Basketball Association players
Women's National Basketball Association statistics